Avraham Gabriel Yehoshua (9 December 1936 – 14 June 2022) was an Israeli novelist, essayist, and playwright. The New York Times called him the "Israeli Faulkner". Underlying themes in Yehoshua's work are Jewish identity, the tense relations with non-Jews, the conflict between the older and younger generations, and the clash between religion and politics.

Biography
Avraham Gabriel ("Boolie") Yehoshua was born to a third-generation Jerusalem family of Sephardi origin from Salonika, Greece. His father Yaakov Yehoshua, the son and grandson of rabbis, was a scholar and author specializing in the history of Jerusalem. His mother, Malka Rosilio, was born and raised in Mogador, Morocco, France, and immigrated to Jerusalem with her parents in 1932. He grew up in Jerusalem's Kerem Avraham neighborhood.

He attended Gymnasia Rehavia municipal high school in Jerusalem. As a youth, Yehoshua was active in the Hebrew Scouts. After completing his studies, Yehoshua drafted to the Israeli army, where he served as a paratrooper from 1954 to 1957, and participated in the 1956 Sinai War. After studying literature and philosophy at the Hebrew University of Jerusalem, he began teaching. He lived in Jerusalem's Neve Sha'anan neighborhood.

From 1963 to 1967, Yehoshua lived and taught in Paris and served as the General Secretary of the World Union of Jewish Students. From 1972, he taught Comparative and Hebrew Literature at the University of Haifa, where he held the rank of Full Professor. In 1975 he was a writer-in-residence at St Cross College, Oxford. He has also been a visiting professor at Harvard (1977), the University of Chicago (1988, 1997, 2000); and Princeton (1992).

Yehoshua was married to Rivka, a clinical psychologist and psychoanalyst, until her death in 2016. He died of esophageal cancer, on June 14, 2022, in Tel Aviv Sourasky Medical Center.

Literary career

From the end of his military service, Yehoshua began to publish fiction. His first book of stories, Mot Hazaken (The Death of the Old Man), was published in 1962. He became a prominent figure in the "new wave" generation of Israeli writers, who differed from their predecessors in focussing more closely on the individual, and on interpersonal concerns, rather than the psychology of a group. Yehoshua named Franz Kafka, Shmuel Yosef Agnon, and William Faulkner as formative influences. Harold Bloom wrote an article about Yehoshua's A Late Divorce in The New York Times, mentioning the work again in his The Western Canon.

Yehoshua is the author of twelve novels, three books of short stories, four plays, and four collections of essays, including Ahizat Moledet (Homeland Lesson, 2008), a book of reflections on identity and literature. His best received novel, Mr Mani, is a multigenerational look at Jewish identity and Israel through five conversations that go backwards in time to cover over 200 years of Jewish life in Jerusalem and around the Mediterranean basin. It was adapted for television as a five-part multilingual series by director Ram Loevy. As do many of his works, his eighth novel, Friendly Fire, explores the nature of dysfunctional family relationships in a drama that moves back and forth between Israel and Tanzania.
His works have been translated and published in 28 countries; many have been adapted for film, television, theatre, and opera.

Views and opinions
Yehoshua was an Israeli Peace Movement activist. He set out his political views in essays and interviews, and attended the signing of the Geneva Accord. Yehoshua was both a long-standing critic of the Israeli occupation and also of Palestinian political culture.
He and other intellectuals mobilized on behalf of the dovish New Movement before the 2009 elections in Israel.

According to La Stampa, before the 2008–2009 Israel-Gaza conflict he published an appeal to Gaza residents urging them to end the violence. He explained why the Israeli operation was necessary and why it needed to end: "Precisely because the Gazans are our neighbors, we need to be proportionate in this operation. We need to try to reach a cease-fire as quickly as possible. We will always be neighbors, so the less blood is shed, the better the future will be." Yehoshua added that he would be happy for the border crossings to be opened completely and for Palestinians to work in Israel as part of a cease-fire.

Yehoshua was criticized by the American Jewish community for his statement that a "full Jewish life could only be had in the Jewish state." He claimed that Jews elsewhere were only "playing with Judaism." "Diaspora Judaism is masturbation," Yehoshua told editors and reporters at The Jerusalem Post. In Israel, he said, it is "the real thing."

Awards and recognition 

 In 1972, Yehoshua received the Prime Minister's Prize for Hebrew Literary Works.
In 1983, he was awarded the Brenner Prize.
 In 1986, he received the Alterman Prize.
 In 1989, he was a co-recipient (jointly with Avner Treinin) of the Bialik Prize for literature.
 In 1995, he was awarded the Israel Prize for Hebrew literature.
 He has also won the National Jewish Book Award for Five seasons in 1990 and the Koret Jewish Book Award in the U.S., as well as the Jewish Quarterly-Wingate Literary Prize in the United Kingdom.
 Yehoshua was shortlisted in 2005 for the first Man Booker International Prize.
 In 2006, "A Woman in Jerusalem" was awarded the Los Angeles Times Book Prize.
 In Italy, he received the Grinzane Cavour Award, the Flaiano Superprize, the Giovanni Boccaccio Prize, and the Viareggio Prize for Lifetime Achievement. In 2003, his novel The Liberated Bride won both the Premio Napoli  and the Lampedusa Literary Prize. Friendly Fire won the Premio Roma in 2008.
 He received honorary doctorates from Hebrew Union College (1990), Tel Aviv University (1998), Torino University (1999), Bar-Ilan University (2000), and Scuola Normale Superiore di Pisa (2012).
 In November 2012, Yehoshua received the Prix Médicis étranger for his novel חסד ספרדי (English: The Retrospective; French: Rétrospective).
 In 2017 he received the Dan David Prize Award.

Quotes
"[Diaspora Jews] change [their] nationalities like jackets. Once they were Polish and Russian; now they are British and American. One day they could choose to be Chinese or Singaporean...For me, Avraham Yehoshua, there is no alternative... I cannot keep my identity outside Israel. [Being] Israeli is my skin, not my jacket.
"I ask myself a question that must be asked: What brought the Germans and what is bringing the Palestinians to such a hatred of us? ... We have a tough history. We came here out of a Jewish experience, and the settlements are messing it up."
"We are not bent on killing Palestinian children to avenge the killing of our children. All we are trying to do is get their leaders to stop this senseless and wicked aggression, and it is only because of the tragic and deliberate mingling between Hamas fighters and the civilian population that children, too, are unfortunately being killed. The fact is that since the disengagement, Hamas has fired only at civilians. Even in this war, to my astonishment, I see that they are not aiming at the army concentrations along the border but time and again at civilian communities"

Works in English translation

Novels
 The Lover [Ha-Me'ahev, 1977]. Garden City N.Y., Doubleday, 1978 (translated by Philip Simpson). Dutton, 1985. Harvest/HBJ, 1993. . London, Halban Publishers, 2004, 2007. .
 A Late Divorce [Gerushim Meuharim, 1982]. London, Harvill Press, 1984. Garden City N.Y., Doubleday, 1984. London, Sphere/Abacus Books, 1985. New York, Dutton, 1985. San Diego, Harcourt Brace, 1993. . London, Halban Publishers 2005. .
 Five Seasons [Molcho, 1987]. New York, Doubleday, 1989. New York, Dutton Obelisk, 1989. London, Collins, 1989. Harmondsworth, Penguin Books, 1990. London, Fontana, 1990, . London, Halban Publishers, 2005, .
 Mr. Mani [Mar Mani, 1989]. New York, Doubleday, 1992. London, Collins, 1992. London, Peter Halban, 1993, 2002 . San Diego, Harvest/HBJ, 1993. London, Phoenix/Orion Books, 1994. .
 Open Heart [Ha-Shiv`a Me-Hodu (The Return from India), 1994]. Garden City N.Y., Doubleday, 1995. London, Halban Publishers, 1996, . San Diego, Harvest/HBJ, 1997. .
 A Journey to the End of the Millennium [Masah El Tom Ha-Elef, 1997]. New York, Doubleday & Co., 1999. London, Peter Halban, 1999. .
 The Liberated Bride [Ha-Kala Ha-Meshachreret, 2001]. London, Peter Halban, 2003, 2004, 2006. .
 A Woman in Jerusalem [Shlihuto Shel Ha-memouneh Al Mashabei Enosh (The Human Resources Supervisor's Mission), 2004]. London, Halban Publishers, 2006, 2011. . New York, Harcourt, 2006. .
 Friendly Fire: A Duet [Esh Yedidutit, 2007] London, Halban Publishers, 2008, . New York, Harcourt 2008, .
 The Retrospective [חסד ספרדי]. New York, Houghton Mifflin Harcourt, 2013. . London, Halban Publishers, 2013. .
 The Extra, 2014
 The Tunnel, New York, Houghton Mifflin Harcourt The Tunnel, 2020 August 4 . London,  Halban Publishers The Tunnel, 2020 February 27 .

Short stories
 Early in the Summer of 1970 [Bi-Thilat Kayitz, 1970, 1972]. Garden City N.Y., Doubleday, 1977. London, Heinemann, 1980. New York, Berkley Publishing, 1981. London, Fontana Paperbacks, 1990. 
 Three Days and a Child [Shlosha Yamim Ve-Yeled, 1975]. Garden City N.Y., Doubleday, 1970. London, Peter Owen, 1971. 
 The Continuing Silence of a Poet. London, Peter Halban, 1988, 1999, . London, Fontana Paperbacks, 1990. London, New York, Penguin, 1991. Syracuse, N.Y., Syracuse University Press, 1998.

Essays
 Israel. London, Collins, 1988. New York, Harper & Row, 1988. Jerusalem, Steimatzky/Collins Harvill, 1988.
 Between Right and Right [Bein Zechut Le-Zechut, 1980]. Garden City N.Y., Doubleday, 1981. 
 The Terrible Power of a Minor Guilt [Kocha Ha-Nora Shel Ashma Ktana, 1998]. New York, Syracuse University Press, 2000. 
 "An Attempt to Identify the Root Cause of Antisemitism", Azure (Spring 2008).

Plays
 A Night in May [Layla Be-May, 1975]. Tel Aviv, Institute for the Translation of Hebrew Literature, 1974.
 Possessions [Hafatzim, 1986]. Portsmouth, Heinemann, 1993.
 Journey to the End of the Millennium, libretto for opera with music by Yosef Bardnaashvili.  Premiered at Israeli Opera, May 2005.
 A Tale of Two Zionists. A play of 1934 meeting of Vladimir Jabotinsky and David Ben-Gurion 2012

See also

 List of Israel Prize recipients
 List of Bialik Prize recipients

References

Further reading

Books
 Halevi-Wise, Yael The Retrospective Imagination of A. B. Yehoshua (University Park, PA: Penn State University Press, 2020). The Retrospective Imagination of A. B. Yehoshua By Yael Halevi-Wise
 Horn, Bernard. Facing the Fires: Conversations with A. B. Yehoshua (Syracuse: University of Syracuse Press, 1998).
 Miron, Dan. A. B. Yehoshua’s Ninth-and-a-Half:An “Ashkenazi” Perspective on Two “Sephardic” Novels [Hebrew]. Tel Aviv: Hakibbutz Hameuhad, 2011.
 Balaban, Avraham. Mr. Molcho: In the Opposite Direction: An Analysis of A. B. Yehoshua’s Mr. Mani and Molcho [Hebrew]. Tel Aviv: Ha-kibbutzha-meuchad, 1992.
 Banbaji, Amir, NitzaBen Dov and Ziva Shamir, eds. Intersecting Perspectives: Essays on A. B.Yehoshua’s Oeuvre [Hebrew]. Tel Aviv: Ha-kibbutz ha-meuchad, 2010.
 Ben-Dov, Nitza, ed. In the Opposite Direction: Articles on Mr. Mani [Hebrew].  Tel Aviv: Ha-kibbutz ha-meuhad, 1995.
 Morahg, Gilead. Furious Compassion: The Fiction of A. B. Yehoshua [Hebrew]. Tel Aviv: Dvir, 2014.

Journal articles
 Gershon Shaked Interviews A. B. Yehoshua By: Shaked, Gershon; Modern Hebrew Literature, 2006 Fall; 3: 157–69.
 A Haifa Life: The Israeli Novelist Talks about Ducking into His Safe Room, Competition among His Writer Friends and Trying to Stay Optimistic about Peace in the Middle East By: Solomon, Deborah; New York Times Magazine, July 30, 2006; 13.
 In the Back Yard of Agnon's House: Between The Liberated Bride by A. B. Yehoshua and S. Y. Agnon By: Ben-Dov, Nitza; Hebrew Studies: A Journal Devoted to Hebrew Language and Literature, 2006; 47: 237–51.
 Yael Halevi-Wise, "The Watchman’s Stance in A. B. Yehoshua’s Fiction," Hebrew Studies 58 (2017): 357–382.
 Talking with A. B. Yehoshua By: Naves, Elaine Kalman; Queen's Quarterly, 2005 Spring; 112 (1): 76–86.
 Yael Halevi-Wise, “La formation d’une identité israélienne dans l’ouvre de A.B. Yehoshua.” Une journée avec Avraham Yehoshua: Revue Lacanienne 30 (2016): 161–172.
 The Silence of the Historian and the Ingenuity of the Storyteller: Rabbi Amnon of Mayence and Esther Minna of Worms By: Yuval, Israel Jacob; Common Knowledge, 2003 Spring; 9 (2): 228–40.
 The Plot of Suicide in A. B. Yehoshua and Leo Tolstoy By: Horn, Bernard; European Legacy: Toward New Paradigms, 2001 Oct; 6 (5): 633–38.
 The Originary Scene, Sacrifice, and the Politics of Normalization in A. B. Yehoshua's Mr. Mani By: Katz, Adam; Anthropoetics: The Electronic Journal of Generative Anthropology, 2001 Fall-2002 Winter; 7 (2): 9 paragraphs.
 Borderline Cases: National Identity and Territorial Affinity in A. B. Yehoshua's Mr. Mani  By: Morahg, Gilead; AJS Review 30:1, 2006: 167–182.
 Yael Halevi-Wise, "Holidays in A. B. Yeshoshua's Opus and Ethos," Shofar: An Interdisciplinary Journal Studies 35.2 (2017): 55–80.
 The Perils of Hybridity: Resisting the Post-Colonial Perspective in A. B. Yehoshua's The Liberating Bride  By: Morahg, Gilead; AJS Review 33:2, 2009: 363–378.
 Portrait of the Artist as an Aging Scholar: A. B. Yehoshua's The Liberating Bride By: Morahg, Gilead;  Hebrew Studies  50, 2009: 175–183.
 Early Warnings: The Grim Vision of The Liberating Bride By: Morahg, Gilead; Mikan 10, 2010: 5–18.
 Ranen Omer-Sherman, “On the verge of a long-craved intimacy’: Distance and Proximity Between Jews and Arab Identities in A. B. Yehoshua's The Liberated Bride,” Journal of Jewish Identities 2.1 (2009): 55- 84.
Yael Halevi-Wise, “Where is the Sephardism in A. B. Yehoshua’s Hesed Sefardi/The Retrospective?” Sephardic Horizons 4.1 (2014): Sephardic Horizons

Book articles
 Horn, Bernard. "Sephardic Identity and Its Discontents: The Novels of A. B. Yehoshua" in Sephardism: Spanish Jewish History and the Modern Literary Imagination, Ed. Yael Halevi-Wise (Stanford University Press, 2012).
 Halevi-Wise, Yael. "A. B. Yehoshua’s Mr. Mani and the Playful Subjectivity of History,”  in Interactive Fictions: Scenes of Storytelling in the Novel. Westport, CT & London: Praeger, 2003. 132–145.
 Morahg, Gilead. Shading the Truth: A. B. Yehoshua's 'Facing the Forests' IN: Cutter and Jacobson, History and Literature: New Readings of Jewish Texts in Honor of Arnold J. Band. Providence, RI: Program in Judaic Studies, Brown University; 2002. pp. 409–18
 Feldman, Yael. Between Genesis and Sophocles: Biblical Psychopolitics in A. B. Yehoshua's Mr. Mani  IN: Cutter and Jacobson, History and Literature: New Readings of Jewish Texts in Honor of Arnold J. Band. Providence, RI: Program in Judaic Studies, Brown University; 2002. pp. 451–64
 Morahg, Gilead. A Story of Sweet Perdition: Mr. Mani and the Terrible Power of a Great Obsession. IN: Banbaji, Ben-Dov and Shamir, Intersecting Perspectives: Essays on A. B. Yehoshua’s Oeuvre. Hakibbutz Hameuchad (Tel Aviv, 2010), pp. 213–225.

External links
 
 Abraham B. Yehoshua Institute for Translation of Hebrew Literature Bio and list of works
 Israel Ministry of Foreign Affairs short bio + links to books
 Above the Drowning Sea, featured witness in documentary on the Shanghai Jews, 2017. Above the Drowning Sea Witnesses
 The Jewish Agency for Israel Short bio
 Zeek Magazine  Shoshana Olidort's review of A.B. Yehoshua's Friendly Fire (2009)
 

1936 births
2022 deaths
Israel Prize in literature recipients
Israeli male novelists
Jewish Israeli writers
Israeli Sephardi Jews
Israeli Mizrahi Jews
Israeli people of Moroccan-Jewish descent
Brenner Prize recipients
EMET Prize recipients in Culture and Art
Academic staff of the University of Haifa
Israeli non-fiction writers
Israeli male dramatists and playwrights
Prix Médicis étranger winners
University of Chicago faculty
Hebrew University of Jerusalem alumni
Writers from Jerusalem
Recipients of Prime Minister's Prize for Hebrew Literary Works
Male non-fiction writers
20th-century Israeli male writers
21st-century Israeli male writers
20th-century Israeli novelists
21st-century Israeli novelists
20th-century Israeli dramatists and playwrights
21st-century Israeli dramatists and playwrights
Deaths from cancer in Israel